= Pourang =

Pourang, Poorang
- Gender: Male
- Language: Persian

Origin
- Meaning: Unknown

Pourang, ( also spelled Poorang ) ( Persian: پورنگ ) is a Persian given name commonly used in Iran, Kurdistan, Azerbaijan, Afghanistan, Pakistan and other countries under Persian culture influence. The word Pourang means: The Son of Color. "Pour"(son) + "Rang"(color).
